Vincent Joseph Naimoli (September 16, 1937 – August 25, 2019) was an American businessman, and the first owner of the Major League Baseball team the Tampa Bay Devil Rays.

Biography
Naimoli's father was an Italian immigrant who worked for the New York City Subway system and became a self-taught stationary engineer.  Naimoli was born in Paterson, New Jersey and attended Paterson Central High School. He attended the University of Notre Dame, graduating in 1959 and earning a master's degree in mechanical engineering from New Jersey Institute of Technology in 1962. Naimoli received a Master of Business Administration degree from Fairleigh Dickinson University in 1964, and attended Harvard Business School's six-week advanced management program in 1974.

Until the end of his life, Naimoli attended Fighting Irish athletic events regularly. Naimoli has three daughters from his first marriage, and one daughter from his second marriage.

Naimoli was a member of the Fairleigh Dickinson University Board of Trustees. The Naimoli Family Baseball Complex on the Metropolitan Campus of Fairleigh Dickinson University was dedicated on October 5, 2011.

Tampa Bay Devil Rays
Naimoli was the founder and first owner of the Tampa Bay Devil Rays, a name which was later shortened to the Tampa Bay Rays in 2008.

Naimoli negotiated a naming-rights deal with Tropicana Products for Tropicana Field, with the team paying for improvements to the stadium and other auxiliary facilities. Naimoli oversaw a design for the stadium with asymmetrical outfield dimensions and dirt base paths, and seats located close to the field of play. FieldTurf was added before the start of the 2000 season.

Thriftiness
Naimoli was known for his thrifty ways.  He refused to purchase internet access and an email system for the Rays to keep costs down, as he felt email was a fad. He also made waves with his enforcement of a policy of not allowing outside food to be brought into the ballpark by team patrons which erupted into an incident in which an elderly woman with diabetes was prevented from bringing food into the park to regulate her sugar levels. As a result, the woman had to sit in her tour bus for the duration of the game.

Naimoli had been attempting to sell his 10-acre mansion in the elite Avila community for at least three years to move into a smaller property.

Philanthropy 
As a long-time resident of Tampa, Naimoli received the very first "Bridging the Bay" award in 1996, recognizing him as the individual who has done the most to unite the citizens of Hillsborough and Pinellas counties. He also received similar community service awards from the Urban League, the Jewish National Fund, the Tampa Sports Club, Boys and Girls Clubs and the Multiple Sclerosis Society. He received an honorary monogram from the Notre Dame Monogram Club in 1999.

Naimoli, who received an MBA in 1964 from Fairleigh Dickinson University, contributed $1 million in 2007 to be used towards the construction of a baseball complex at his alma mater. The gift paid for the 2011 construction of the Naimoli Family Baseball Complex on FDU's Teaneck, New Jersey campus.

In 2006, Naimoli made a contribution of $5 million to his undergraduate alma mater, the University of Notre Dame, to be used towards a $24.7 million renovation project of the Edmund P. Joyce Center, an 11,418-seat multi-purpose arena that is used by the school's basketball and volleyball teams. A  club / hospitality area which will include concession stands and restrooms, designed to accommodate 750 spectators, will be named for the Naimoli family.

In 2009, Naimoli donated towards the construction of the Naimoli Family Athletic and Recreational Facility at New Jersey Institute of Technology.

Naimoli also claimed to have made many more millions of dollars' worth of "anonymous donations" to various charities.

Death
Naimoli was diagnosed with progressive supranuclear palsy in 2014 and died on August 25, 2019, at the age of 81.

References

External links 
 Short biography

1937 births
2019 deaths
John F. Kennedy High School (Paterson, New Jersey) alumni
Major League Baseball owners
Major League Baseball executives
Fairleigh Dickinson University alumni
Tampa Bay Devil Rays owners
Tampa Bay Devil Rays executives
University of Notre Dame alumni
American people of Italian descent
American company founders
Businesspeople from New Jersey
Sportspeople from Paterson, New Jersey
20th-century American businesspeople
Neurological disease deaths in Florida
Deaths from progressive supranuclear palsy